Fyodor Kuz’mích, also Feódor Kuz’mích,, or Righteous Theodore of Tomsk, Siberian, elder, or Fomich (born c. 1776 – died 1 February 1864, in Tomsk) was a Russian Orthodox starets. He was canonized as a righteous saint by the Russian Orthodox Church in 1984. There are many variations of a legend that claims that he was Alexander I of Russia who faked his death in 1825 to become a hermit. The question is still pending between historians.

Biography 
There are no accounts of Feodor Kuzmich's early life. The first reported incident involving Kuzmich occurred on 4 September 1836, in Perm. His strange appearance alerted the local blacksmith who contact the authorities. He was described as tall, about 60 years old with lashes on his back. Kuzmich did not have any documents and the authorities subsequently arrested him. Following the arrest, Kuzmich was interrogated in which he claimed he was illiterate, Eastern Orthodox, and did not remember his infancy. The court ruled that due to his lack of documents he be lashed and sent to the Siberian city of Tomsk. During his travel to Tomsk, he was unusually not restrained by shackles.

According to his life's history, Kuzmich lived a life of rigor, sleeping on a bare board and wearing only simple clothes. Due to Kuzmich's strange appearance and mannerism, residents assumed that his previous life was quite different from his present. Before and after his death many miracles were attributed to Kuzmich. When asked about his previous life, Kuzmich responded:

"Why do you usually think that my situation is worse now than it was once before? At the present time I am free, independent, and, most importantly, – easy-going. Before, my peace and happiness depended on many conditions: it was necessary to take care of my loved ones enjoying the same happiness as I did, so that my friends would not deceive me ... Now there is nothing of this except what will always remain with me – except the words of my God, except for the love of the Savior and neighbor. Now I have no grief and disappointment, because I do not depend on anything earthly, nor on anything that is not in my power. You do not understand what happiness is in this freedom of the spirit, in this unearthly joy. If you would restore me to the former position and make me again the guardian of earthly wealth, perishable and now altogether unnecessary to me, then I would be an unhappy man. The more our body is pampered and groomed, the more our spirit becomes weaker. Every luxury relaxes our body and weakens our soul."

Upon his death, Kuzmich's grave was visited by prominent people such as the Grand Duke Alexei Alexandrovich and Nicholas II.

In 1984, Kuzmich was canonized as a saint by Patriarch Pimen I of the Russian Orthodox Church.

Rumors of a previous life 
According to one account, he lived in a modest house with a garden; protected in a variety of ways by the Imperial Chancery, he received a visit from Tsarevich Alexander in 1837 and his grave was visited by Tsarevich Nicholas in 1893. Rumors of Alexander's tomb being empty have persisted since 1866. According to legend, Alexander's tomb has been opened four times, with the latest happening in 1921 when Soviet authorities allegedly opened his tomb in search of valuable metals. In each case it was reported that the tomb was empty or exhibited signs of tampering.

It is suspected that Alexander I would have faked his death due to feelings of guilt about his father Paul I's death, and he faked his death to abdicate his throne and seek forgiveness for allowing his father to be killed. Prominent visitors include Innocent of Alaska, Father Peter Popov, and Bishop Athanasius of Irkutsk. In addition, Kuzmich is reported to have known French and spoke about life in Saint Petersburg and Moscow, as well as speaking about prominent people as if they were his friends.

Kuzmich discussed in detail Metropolitan Philarate, as well as intimate details about the war of 1812. By this time, there were many rumors that Kuzmich was in fact Alexander I. On his deathbed, the priest reportedly asked him if he was in fact the Alexander the Blessed. In response, Kuzmich said, "Your works are wonderful, Lord ... There is no secret, which is not opened."

Support for the legend 

Among some of reasons supporting the belief that Alexander I faked his death are curious similarities between Alexander and Kuzmich. Svetlana Semyonova, president of Russian Graphological Society, analyzed both Alexander's and Kuzmich's handwriting and concluded that they are the same. Furthermore, there are rumors that Alexander's wife also faked her death a year after Alexander's death and became a nun in Saint Petersburg.

In his work Posthumous Notes of the Hermit Fëdor Kuzmich, author Lev Tolstoy referred to the legend when he wrote:

"After the monk's death these rumours only spread and became stronger. Not only common people believed them but many from the elite, including the royal family of Tsar Alexander III.The reasons for these rumours were the following: Alexander died unexpectedly, he did not suffer from any disease before, he died far away from home in a remote place of Taganrog, and when he was put in the coffin many who saw him, said that he changed a lot, this is why the coffin was quickly sealed. It was known that Alexander said and wrote that he wanted so much to leave his post and to stay away from this world."

Canonization 
In the beginning of 20th century a chapel was built over his tomb.

In 1984 his name was added to Russian Church Menologium by Patriarch Pimen I, next year on 5 July 1985, his relics were translated and a new chapel was built.

His feast days are:

 10 June (Saints of Siberia)
 20 January (Day of death, Siberia)
 22 June (Translation, Diocese of Tomsk)

References

Further reading 
 Stone, Barry. I Want to be Alone: Solitary Lives: salvation seekers, celebrity recluses, hermit poets and survivalists from the Buddha to Greta Garbo (Allen & Unwin, 2010).
 Troubetzkoy, Alexis S (2002). Imperial Legend: The Mysterious Disappearance of Tsar Alexander I, Arcade Publishing, New York.

1864 deaths
19th-century people from the Russian Empire
19th-century Christian saints
19th-century Christian mystics
Starets
Alexander I of Russia
Eastern Orthodox mystics
Ascetics
Russian saints
Hermits
People from Tomsk
Christian saints of the Late Modern era
Russian religious leaders
Russian saints of the Eastern Orthodox Church
Tomsk Governorate
Miracle workers
Year of birth unknown